Furman Lee "Jack" Owens (May 6, 1908 – November 14, 1958) was a Major League Baseball catcher.

Sources

Major League Baseball catchers
Philadelphia Athletics players
Wichita Falls Spudders players
Longview Cannibals players
St. Augustine Saints players
Montgomery Rebels players
Greenville Spinners players
Columbia Reds players
Birmingham Barons players
Macon Peaches players
Portsmouth Cubs players
Baseball players from South Carolina
1908 births
1958 deaths